The Bulls Gap Historic District is located in the town of Bulls Gap in the southeastern corner of Hawkins County in East
Tennessee. The town of Bulls Gap is located near a pass or "gap" in Bays Mountain.

Two major rail lines pass through the Town of Bulls Gap, one running in a
northeast-southwest direction and the other in a northwest-southeast
direction. The two lines are connected by a number of spur
lines that form a triangular area. The commercial section of old Bulls
Gap is centered along this triangular area of tracks.

The majority of the buildings in the district are located along South Main
Street, a long winding road that runs primarily in a north-south
direction. The northernmost end of South Main Street begins at U.S. Route 11E and Tennessee State Route 66 and continues downhill. The northern end of South Main Street
is primarily residential and the residential section extends a short way
beyond the bridge until the second major turn in the road. At this point
the commercial area begins with several store buildings centered around
the tracks and the site of the former train depot. After South Main Street
crosses the tracks and Church Street, the district once again becomes
residential.

Forty-eight buildings and eight structures are considered as contributing
resources to the Bulls Gap Historic District. Contributing buildings
include twenty-two residences, two churches, ten commercial buildings, and
fourteen outbuildings. Contributing structures include three water towers, two bridges, and three outbuildings.

In 1792 John Bull, a gunsmith, received a North Carolina land grant for
fifty-five acres of land on Bays Mountain near an important east-west
passageway over the mountain. Bull operated a stageline through this
passageway which became known as Bull's Gap. Little information is known
about the early settlement of Bulls Gap.

Because of the important railroad line through the
mountains, Bulls Gap became a strategically important location for both sides of the Civil War. Bulls Gap became a fortified town and between 1863
and 1865 many battles were fought to gain control of the town and its
railroad. Throughout most of the war, the Union Army retained control
of Bulls Gap and the railroad.

List of historic structures

References

Buildings and structures in Hawkins County, Tennessee
Geography of Hawkins County, Tennessee
Historic districts on the National Register of Historic Places in Tennessee
National Register of Historic Places in Hawkins County, Tennessee